Euspira is a genus of medium-sized sea snails, marine gastropod molluscs in the subfamily Polinicinae  of the  family Naticidae, the moon snails.

Fossil reports
This genus is known in the fossil records from the Triassic to the Quaternary (age range: from 242.0 to 0.0  million years ago). Fossils are found in the marine strata throughout the world. There are about 25 extinct species.

Species 
Species within the genus Euspira include:
 
 Euspira abyssicola (E. A. Smith, 1896)
 Euspira agujana (Dall, W.H., 1908)
 Euspira blaizensis (Kilburn, 1976)
 Euspira borshengjungi K.-Y. Lai, 2017
 Euspira catena (Costa, E.M. da, 1778)
 Euspira crawfordiana (Dall, 1908)
 † Euspira elegans (Suter, 1917)
 † Euspira eyrensis Finlay, 1927 
 Euspira fringilla (Dall, 1881)
 Euspira fusca (Blainville, H.M.D. de, 1825)
 † Euspira fyfei (Marwick, 1924)
 Euspira gilva (Philippi, 1851)
 † Euspira glaucinoides (J. Sowerby, 1812) 
 Euspira grossularia (Marche-Marchad, I., 1957)
 Euspira guilleminii (Payraudeau, 1826)
 † Euspira helicina (Brocchi, 1814) 
 Euspira heros (Say, T., 1822)
 † Euspira ilhagwilensis Pacaud, 2016 
 Euspira intricata (Donovan, 1804)
 † Euspira lateaperta (Marwick, 1924)
 Euspira lemaitrei (Kilburn, 1976)
 Euspira levicula (A. E. Verrill, 1880)
 Euspira levis (E. A. Smith, 1896)
 Euspira litorina (Dall, 1908)
 Euspira macilenta (Philippi, 1844)
 Euspira massieri Petuch & Berschauer, 2018
 Euspira montagui (Forbes, E., 1838)
 Euspira monterona Dall, 1919
 Euspira napus (Smith, E.A., 1904)
 Euspira nitida (Donovan, E., 1804)
 Euspira notabilis Jeffreys, 1885
 Euspira nubila (Dall, 1889)
 Euspira nux (Okutani, 1964)
 Euspira obtusa (Jeffreys, 1885)
 Euspira pallida (Broderip, W.J. & G.B. I Sowerby, 1829)
 Euspira pardoana (Dall, 1908)
 Euspira phaeocephala (Dautzenberg & Fischer H., 1896)
 Euspira pila (Pilsbry, H.A., 1911)
 Euspira plicispira (Kuroda, T., 1961)
 Euspira presubplicata (Bouchet & Warén, 1993)
 Euspira sagamiensis Kuroda & Habe, 1971
 Euspira strebeli (Dall, 1908)
 Euspira subplicata (Jeffreys, 1885)
 Euspira talismani Bouchet & Warén, 1993
 Euspira tenuis (Récluz, 1851)
 Euspira tenuistriata (Dautzenberg, Ph. & H. Fischer, 1911)
 Euspira triseriata (Say, T., 1826)
 † Euspira varians (Dujardin, 1837) 
 Euspira yokoyamai (Kuroda & Habe, 1952)

Species brought into synonymy
 Euspira acosmita Dall, 1919: synonym of Cryptonatica affinis (Gmelin, 1791)
 Euspira bahamensis Dall, 1925: synonym of Sigatica semisulcata (Gray, 1839)
 Euspira canonica Dall, 1919: synonym of Euspira pallida (Broderip & G.B. Sowerby I, 1829)
 Euspira draconis (Dall, 1903): synonym of Glossaulax draconis (Dall, 1903)
 Euspira falklandica (Preston, 1913): synonym of Falsilunatia falklandica (Preston, 1913)
 Euspira fortunei (Reeve, 1855): synonym of Laguncula pulchella Benson, 1842
 Euspira immaculata (Totten, 1835): synonym of Polinices immaculatus (Totten, 1835)
 Euspira lewisii (Gould, 1847): synonym of Lunatia lewisii (Gould, 1847)
 Euspira nana (Møller, 1842): synonym of Pseudopolinices nanus (Møller, 1842)
 Euspira patagonica (Philippi, 1845): synonym of Falsilunatia patagonica (Philippi, 1845)
 Euspira poliana (delle Chiaje, 1830): synonym of Euspira pulchella (Risso, 1826)
 Euspira politiana Dall, 1919: synonym of Lunatia pallida (Broderip & G.B. Sowerby I, 1829)
 Euspira pulchella (Risso, 1826): synonym of Euspira nitida (Donovan, 1804)
 Euspira rouxi (Nicklès, 1952): synonym of Natica rouxi Nicklès, 1952
 Euspira sandwichensis (Dall, 1895): synonym of Natica sandwichensis (Dall, 1895)
 Euspira venusta Suter, 1907: synonym of Globisinum venustum (Suter, 1907)

References

 Sowerby J. 1837. Mineral-Conchologie Grossbrittaniens, von James Sowerby; deutsche Bearbeitung, herausgegeben von Hercules Nicolet, durchgesehen von Dr. Agassiz. Neuchatel: H. Nicolet, 52 pp., 21 pis. page(s): 14
 Backeljau, T. (1986). Lijst van de recente mariene mollusken van België [List of the recent marine molluscs of Belgium]. Koninklijk Belgisch Instituut voor Natuurwetenschappen: Brussels, Belgium. 106 pp
 Vaught, K.C. (1989). A classification of the living Mollusca. American Malacologists: Melbourne, FL (USA). . XII, 195 pp
 Gofas, S.; Le Renard, J.; Bouchet, P. (2001). Mollusca, in: Costello, M.J. et al. (Ed.) (2001). European register of marine species: a check-list of the marine species in Europe and a bibliography of guides to their identification. Collection Patrimoines Naturels, 50: pp. 180–213

External links
 Kabat A. R. (1991). The classification of the Naticidae (Mollusca Gastropoda). Review and analysis of the supraspecific taxa. Bulletin of the Museum of Comparative Zoology 152: 417-449
 Huelsken T., Tapken D., Dahlmann T., Wägele H., Riginos C. & Hollmann M. (2012) Systematics and phylogenetic species delimitation within Polinices s.l. (Caenogastropoda: Naticidae) based on molecular data and shell morphology. Organisms, Diversity & Evolution 12: 349-375

Naticidae
Extant Triassic first appearances